is the fourth single by the Hello! Project unit Buono!. The title song was used as the fourth ending theme of anime Shugo Chara! from July until September 2008. The single was released on August 20, 2008 in Japan under the Pony Canyon label in two different versions: regular (PCCA.70223) and limited (PCCA.02731). The limited edition contained a bonus DVD containing "making of" footage for the PV, while both the limited edition and first press of the normal edition came with a serial number card, used in a promotional draw, and an original Buono! trading card, with the picture on the card differing by edition. The Single V DVD was released on September 3, 2008. The single peaked at #6 on the weekly Oricon charts, and charted for five weeks.

Track listing

CD

Limited edition DVD

Single V

Oricon rank and sales

References

External links 
 "Gachinko de Ikō!" entries on the Hello! Project official website: CD, Single V DVD 

2008 singles
Shugo Chara!
Buono! songs
Song recordings produced by Tsunku
2008 songs
Songs with lyrics by Yuho Iwasato
Pony Canyon singles